Jirayr Ohanyan Çakır (also known as Zhirayr Ohanian) (February 5, 1923 – 2003) was a chess player, coach, and former president of the Turkish Chess Federation.

Life
Of Armenian descent, Jirayr Ohanyan Çakır was born in Istanbul, Turkey on February 5, 1921. His father Avedis, who was from Merzifon, was the owner of the famous Markiz Bakery and was one of the biggest donors to the Turkish Armed Forces. His mother Anna-Mari was from Bursa and was a teacher at the Private Armenian School of Pangaltı and the Galatasaray High School.

Ohanyan Çakır was introduced to chess when he was a student at Galatasaray High School. In 1943, with his classmate Turan Başak, he became a member of the school's chess club. After attaining lessons from famed Chess player Selim Palavan, Ohanyan Çakır conducted chess courses at the Şişli Sports Club and gathered at least 400 students. Şişli Sports Club experienced its "golden age" during this period in terms of chess.

Later career
Ohanyan Çakır was elected president of the Sports Club of Şişli in 1964. He traveled to the Chess Olympiad in Tel Aviv in 1964 and captained the Turkish National Team. Between 1964-1977, he was a member of the board of directors of the Turkish Chess Federation.

Between 1976-1977, he became the president of the Istanbul Chess Federation.

He was elected president of the Taksim Sports Association in 1977.

Between 1978 and 1982, he was the president of the Turkish Chess Federation.

In 1986 he assumed the position of general secretary of the Turkish Chess Federation and was elected honorary advisory board member of the federation in 1988.

From 1989 and onwards, he became the chess coach of numerous Armenian schools throughout Istanbul.

Family life
He is the father of a boy and two girls and a grandfather of four. His daughter Linda became the women's chess champion of Turkey in  1972.

Legacy
In 2011 a chess tournament was organized in his honor in Istanbul.

See also
 Armenians in Turkey

References

Turkish chess players
Chess coaches
Turkish people of Armenian descent
1923 births
2003 deaths
Sportspeople from Istanbul
20th-century chess players